The 2010 Women's Rugby World Cup Final was a rugby union match that determined the 2010 Women's Rugby World Cup winner. The match occurred on 5 September 2010 at the Twickenham Stoop in Twickenham, London and was contested between New Zealand and England for a third time. It was England's record fifth appearance in a Final and New Zealand's fourth. New Zealand made history with their fourth back-to-back title after defeating England in a tightly contested match.

Route to the final 

New Zealand was placed in Pool A with South Africa, Australia and Wales. England was in Pool B along with Ireland, Kazakhstan and the United States. New Zealand started their World Cup campaign with a 55–3 trouncing of South Africa. Carla Hohepa scored a hat-trick and Kelly Brazier slotted in five conversions. South Africa's only points came by way of a penalty in the 66th minute. Australia were New Zealand's next opponents in the pool; Wallaroos Prop Lindsay Morgan shocked the defending champions by scoring first in the 8th minute. Despite playing into the elements for most of the first half, the Black Ferns managed to go into halftime 22–5. They only managed 10 points in the second half as they defeated Australia 32–5. Kelly Brazier's hat-trick helped New Zealand thrash Wales 41–8 in their last pool game. New Zealand met France in the semi-final, they scored five tries with three successful conversions in the first half. France only answer came from hooker, Laetitia Salles, who scored a late first half try just before the break and begin halftime 31–7. New Zealand scored only 14 points in the second half and ended the game 45–7.

England beat Ireland 27–0 in their first pool match as they scored four unanswered tries. In their second pool game, Fiona Pocock and Charlotte Barras each scored a hat-trick as England ran in 14 tries as they heavily defeated Kazakhstan 82–0. Inaugural champions, the United States were England's last pool opponents. Danielle Waterman scored a brace of tries and four other try scorers also crossed the try line to help England beat USA 37–10. England met Australia who had reached the semi-finals for the first time. It was a hard fought match but England triumphed in the end, 15–0, as they booked a final showdown with New Zealand.

Match

Summary 
England spent the first ten minutes of the game stuck in their own half but did not concede a single point. Anna Richards was sin-binned in the 22nd minute for killing the ball and was later joined by Mel Bosman 7 minutes later for the same offence, however England could not capitalize on the fact that New Zealand were down to 13 players. Winger Carla Hohepa eventually broke through the English defence and scored for the Black Ferns, a successful conversion by Kelly Brazier put them in the lead 7–0 at half-time.

Three minutes into the second half Katy McLean kicked a penalty and reduced their deficit to 5 points. 13 minutes later Brazier kicked another penalty and increased New Zealand's lead to 10–3. New Zealand captain Melissa Ruscoe was sin-binned in the 57th minute, this time England took advantage of the Black Ferns misfortune as Charlotte Barras scored moments later and a conversion to Katy McLean leveled the game at 10–10. Kelly Brazier's penalty in the 66th minute helped New Zealand secure their fourth World title as they edged England 13–10.

References 

Final
New Zealand women's national rugby union team
England women's national rugby union team
2010 in New Zealand rugby union
2010–11 in English rugby union
2010 in New Zealand women's sport
2010 in English women's sport
Women's rugby union matches
2010
September 2010 sports events in the United Kingdom
Rugby union in London
International sports competitions in London